Virtue signalling is the expression of a moral viewpoint with the intent of communicating good character.

Definition 

According to the Cambridge Dictionary, virtue signalling is "an attempt to show other people that you are a good person, for example by expressing opinions that will be acceptable to them, especially on social media... indicating that one has virtue merely by expressing disgust or favour for certain political ideas or cultural happenings". The expression is often used to imply by the user that the virtue being signalled is exaggerated or insincere.

One example often cited as virtue signalling is "greenwashing" (a compound word modelled on "whitewash"), when a company deceptively claims that its products or policies are more environmentally friendly than they actually are.

History 

According to The Guardian, the term has been used since at least 2004, appearing for example in religious academic works in 2010 and 2012.

British journalist James Bartholomew claims to have originated the modern usage of the term "virtue signalling," in a 2015 Spectator article. His 2015 formulation described virtue signalling as empty boasting (directly or otherwise):

No one actually has to do anything. Virtue comes from mere words or even from silently held beliefs. There was a time in the distant past when people thought you could only be virtuous by doing things...[that] involve effort and self-sacrifice.

Merriam-Webster editor Emily Brewster describes both "virtue signalling" and "humblebrag" (a term coined by Harris Wittels in 2010) as examples of "self-glorifying online behavior."

Opinion 

Psychologists Jillian Jordan and David Rand argued that virtue signalling is separable from genuine outrage towards a particular belief, but in most cases, individuals who are virtue signalling are, in fact, simultaneously experiencing genuine outrage. Linguist David Shariatmadari argued in The Guardian that the very act of accusing someone of virtue signalling is an act of virtue signalling in itself. The Conversations Karen Stollznow said that the term is often used as "a sneering insult by those on the right against progressives to dismiss their statements." Zoe Williams, also writing for The Guardian, suggested the phrase was the "sequel insult to champagne socialist".

Financial Times editor Robert Shrimsley suggested the counterpart term "vice signalling" for people who too-loudly proclaim their right-wing bonafides:

A vice-signaller boasts about sneaking meat into a vegetarian meal. He will rush on to social media to denounce as a 'snowflake' any woman who objects to receiving rape threats, or any minority unhappy at a racist joke...Vice-signallers have understood that there is money to be made in the outrage economy by playing the villain. Perhaps, secretly, they buy their clothes at the zero-waste shop and help out at the local food bank, but cannot be caught doing so lest their image is destroyed.

"Vice signalling" has been used variously elsewhere, to refer either to "show[ing] you are tough, hard-headed, a dealer in uncomfortable truths, and, above all, that you live in 'the real world'", in a way that goes beyond what actual pragmatism requires, or to "a public display of immorality, intended to create a community based on cruelty and disregard for others, which is proud of it at the same time."

Examples

Social media 

Angela Nagle, in her book Kill All Normies, described the internet reactions to the Kony 2012 viral video as "what we might now call 'virtue signaling, and that "the usual cycles of public displays of outrage online began as expected with inevitable competitive virtue signaling" in the aftermath of the killing of Harambe.  B. D. McClay wrote in The Hedgehog Review that signalling particularly flourished in online communities. It was unavoidable in digital interactions because they lacked the qualities of offline life, such as spontaneity. When one filled out a list of one's favourite books for Facebook, one was usually aware of what that list said about oneself.

Blackout Tuesday, a collective action that was ostensibly intended to combat racism and police brutality that was carried out on June2, 2020, mainly by businesses and celebrities through social media in response to the killings of several black people by police officers, was criticized as a form of virtue signalling for the initiative's "lack of clarity and direction".

Marketing 

In addition to individuals, companies have also been accused of virtue signalling in marketing, public relations, and brand communication. Conspicuous consumption has been described as a form of consumer virtue signalling, and the social desirability bias of survey respondents may complicate business data gathering.

Film industry 

Actors and other celebrities may be accused of virtue-signalling if their actions are seen to contradict their expressed views.

See also 

 Do-gooder derogation
 Grandstanding
 NPC (meme)
 Slacktivism
 Social justice warrior
 Woke

References

Further reading

External links 
 

2010s neologisms
2020s neologisms
Moral psychology
Political neologisms
Social commentary
Social influence
Virtue
Hypocrisy